Pulsatilla chinensis is a species of plant in the family Ranunculaceae and is one of the 50 fundamental herbs used in traditional Chinese medicine. There it has the name bái tóu wēng.

See also
Chinese herbology

References

External links
Pulsatilla chinensis (Plants for a Future Database)

chinensis
Plants used in traditional Chinese medicine
Taxa named by Alexander von Bunge